Marilyn Crispell (born March 30, 1947) is an American jazz pianist and composer. Scott Yanow described her as "a powerful player... who has her own way of using space... She is near the top of her field." Jon Pareles of The New York Times wrote: "Hearing Marilyn Crispell play solo piano is like monitoring an active volcano... She is one of a very few pianists who rise to the challenge of free jazz." In addition to her own extensive work as a soloist or bandleader, Crispell is also known as a longtime member of saxophonist Anthony Braxton's quartet in the 1980s and '90s.

Biography
Crispell was born in Philadelphia and, at the age of ten, moved to Baltimore, where she attended Western High School. She studied classical piano at the Peabody Conservatory beginning at age seven, and also began improvising at an early age, thanks to a teacher who required all her students to improvise regardless of their skill level. She later attended the New England Conservatory of Music, where she studied piano and composition, graduating in 1968. Crispell was not interested in jazz until 1975, when, while living on Cape Cod, she heard John Coltrane's A Love Supreme for the first time. She recalls: "The emotional and spiritual quality of it overpowered me... I can honestly say it's possibly the most overpowering experience I've ever had in my life. That one night of listening to A Love Supreme over and over and over just completely changed my life."

Crispell soon returned to Boston, where she studied jazz privately with Charlie Banacos for two years. According to Crispell, "I had to, like, really go from scratch. I had to do everything in twelve keys. I had to write out seven solos in every key on every piece. I had to listen to tons of stuff and transcribe it to be able to hear and understand what was happening, you know, within the confines of these time cycles and chord changes. How were people using the chords and the notes and the chords and the scales? Where did they go outside of them?" 

While in Boston, she met saxophonist Charlie Mariano, who suggested she consider attending sessions at the Creative Music Studio in Woodstock, NY, founded by Karl Berger, Ingrid Sertso, and Ornette Coleman. In 1977, she visited the studio for a summer, and came into contact with musicians such as Cecil Taylor, Don Cherry, Roscoe Mitchell, Wadada Leo Smith, Anthony Davis, and Oliver Lake. Regarding her first encounter with Taylor, she recalled: "I remember the day I first met Cecil Taylor... He was playing pool, and there was a piano behind the pool room. So I sat at the piano and gave him an impromptu concert, hoping he'd listen. When I was finished he kissed my hand, and said, 'This lady can play!' I'm still flattered to hear my name mentioned in the same breath." (During this time, people frequently referred to her as "the female Cecil Taylor" due to her fiery approach to the piano and her tendency to play "lots of notes, all of the time. Continuously, without much of a break.") Regarding her time at the Creative Music Studio, she stated: "It was and is a unique place in the world for the kind of music that we do... If it had taken place in New York City I don't think the feeling would have been the same. Here you were living and eating and hanging out with the guiding artists in this country motel setting. People would be up all night making bonfires and playing outside on the lawn with musicians from all over the world. It was a very important human experience and I met many of the people I ended up playing with." Upon completion of the session, Crispell quickly moved to Woodstock and has resided there ever since.

While at the Creative Music Studio, Crispell also met Anthony Braxton, who invited her to sit in with his group. She recalls: "At our first gig Anthony placed a beer in my hand and said, 'Relax, don't play so many notes.' I was playing like a thousand notes a minute, and he was the first person to make me think of space and breath and phrasing, as opposed to a constant barrage." She was soon invited to join Braxton's Creative Music Orchestra and his quartet, of which she was a member from 1983 to 1995, and which also featured bassist Mark Dresser, and drummer Gerry Hemingway. During this time, she made roughly a dozen recordings with Braxton, and also began releasing recordings under her own name. Regarding her tenure with the group, she stated: "[I]t was like a family. Playing with Anthony really taught me a lot about space, the use of space and silence and breath, and the use of composition in improvisation... Just being inside his compositions taught me a lot about composition... What really impressed me is that he was composing in a way that was very similar to contemporary classical musicians but with a lot more freedom, allowing interpretation.". Since then, silence and space have become known as a central part of her recordings. As she noted in an interview with PostGenre, Marilyn noted, "[W]hen I first started playing creative music, I don’t think I left much of any silence in my performances. I was focused heavily on playing into the energy and showing what I could do. That kind of thinking is very far away from my mindset now."

During the late 1970s and 1980s, she also worked and recorded with Reggie Workman, Roscoe Mitchell, Wadada Leo Smith, the Barry Guy New Orchestra, the Henry Grimes Trio, the European Quartet Noir (with Urs Leimgruber, Fritz Hauser, and Joëlle Léandre), and Babatunde Olatunji. In 1981 she performed at the Woodstock Jazz Festival, held in celebration of the tenth anniversary of the Creative Music Studio.

In the early 1990s, her style began to evolve further when she visited Stockholm, where she heard a Swedish group that included bassist Anders Jormin. She recalls: "It just touched a nerve in me... it unlocked the door to the lyrical things that I would have liked to be doing and wasn't doing." "Some of this kind of beauty and Nordic sound and tenderness opened up something in me that I had really kept hidden because I was trying to be really strong all the time. Even when I played romantic things I played them with a lot of energy. So suddenly this other sound entered into my consciousness and it resonated with something in me that I had not allowed to be expressed." She soon performed and recorded with Jormin and his Bortom Quintet. In 1996, she recorded Nothing Ever Was, Anyway: Music of Annette Peacock with Gary Peacock, Paul Motian, and Annette Peacock, her first album for ECM. Regarding her ECM recordings, she stated: "A lot of the stuff I have been doing with ECM is more about an inner intensity rather than an outer one. I feel there is a connection between the two states - wild energy and extreme introversion - two sides of the same coin. I do both and feel like there is an organic connection between them - an integration between them. With the ECM recordings, I like the idea of playing things so slowly that you are almost suspended in time."

Crispell has continued to perform and record extensively as a soloist and leader of her own groups, as well as with the Evan Parker Trio, an all-female trio led by Denmark’s Lotte Anker, Tisziji Munoz, Ivo Perelman, Scott Fields, the Copenhagen Art Ensemble, Trio Tapestry with saxophonist Joe Lovano and bassist Carmen Castaldi, Trio 3 (Reggie Workman, Oliver Lake, Andrew Cyrille), the Dave Douglas Trio, Tyshawn Sorey, and many other musicians. She has also performed and recorded music by contemporary composers such as John Cage, Pauline Oliveros, Robert Cogan, Pozzi Escot, Manfred Niehaus, and Anthony Davis (including his opera X, The Life and Times of Malcolm X with the New York City Opera).

She has taught improvisation workshops and given lecture/demonstrations across the world and has collaborated with poets, dancers, filmmakers, and videographers. She has been the recipient of a Guggenheim Fellowship in Music Composition (2005-2006), a Mary Flagler Cary Charitable Trust composition commission (1988-1989), and three New York Foundation for the Arts fellowship grants (1988-1989, 1994-1995 and 2006-2007). In 1996, Crispell was presented with an Outstanding Alumni Award by the New England Conservatory, and in 2004, was named as being one of their 100 most outstanding alumni of the past 100 years. She is the author of the instructional DVD "A pianist's guide to free improvisation: keys to unlocking your creativity" (2002, Homespun Video).

In 2000, Crispell appeared in the French film Women in Jazz by Gilles Corre. In 2005–2006, she performed and recorded with the NOW Orchestra in Vancouver, and was co-director of the Vancouver Creative Music Institute and a faculty member at the Banff Centre International Workshop in Jazz. She also created and directed a multi media production entitled Cy Twombly Dreamhouse, with choreography by Savia Berger. In 2017, she collaborated with Jo Ganter, visual artist, and Raymond MacDonald, saxophonist, both from Scotland, on Drawing Sound, an exhibition of graphic scores at the Kleinert/James Gallery, Woodstock, NY.

Discography

As leader/co-leader

As side musician

with Lotte Anker and Marilyn Mazur
 Poetic Justice (Dacapo, 2001)

with Thurman Barker
 The Way I Hear It (Uptee Productions, 1998)

with Anthony Braxton
 Composition 98 (hatART, 1981)
 Six Compositions (Quartet) 1984 (Black Saint, 1985)
 Quartet (London) 1985 (Leo, 1985 [1988]) 
 Prag 1984 (Quartet Performance) (Sound Aspects, 1984 [1990])
 Quartet (Birmingham) 1985 (Leo, 1985 [1991])
 Willisau (Quartet) 1991 (hatART, 1991)
 Quartet (Coventry) 1985 (Leo, 1985 [1993])
 (Victoriaville) 1992 (Victo, 1993)
 Twelve Compositions: Recorded Live in July 1993 at Yoshi's in Oakland California (Music & Arts, 1994)
 Creative Orchestra (Köln) 1978 (hatART, 1978 [1995])
 Quartet (Santa Cruz) 1993 (hatART, 1993 [1997])
 The Coventry Concert (Bootleg / Unauthorized, 2006)
 Orchestra (Paris) 1978 (Bootleg / Unauthorized, 2011)
 Quartet (New York) 1993 - Set 1 (Bootleg / Unauthorized, 2011)
 Quartet (New York) 1993 - Set 2 (Bootleg / Unauthorized, 2011)
 The Complete Remastered Recordings on Black Saint & Soul Note (C.A.M. Jazz, 2011)
 Quartet (Karlsruhe) 1983 (live, archival) (New Braxton House, 2012)
 Quartet (Mulhouse) 1983 (live, archival) (New Braxton House, 2012)
 CMS Archive Selections, Volume 2 (Planet Arts, 2015)

with Andrea Centazzo
 Stolen Moment (Ictus, 2020)

with Agustí Fernández
 River Tiger Fire  (Fundacja Słuchaj!, 2015)

with Scott Fields
 48 Motives, January 11, 1996 (Cadence, 1996)
 Five Frozen Eggs (Music & Arts, 1997)
 Stephen Dembski – Sonotropism (Music & Arts, 1997)

with John Geggie and Nick Fraser
 Geggie Project (Ambiances Magnétiques, 2008)

with The Glasgow Improvisers Orchestra and Evan Parker
 Parallel Moments Unbroken  (FMR, 2018)

with Barry Guy
 Blue Horizon. Barry Guy@70 [Live At The Ad Libitum Festival 2017] (Fundacja Słuchaj!, 2018)

with Barry Guy London Jazz Composer's Orchestra
 Three Pieces for Orchestra (Intakt, 1997)
 Double Trouble Two (Intakt, 1998)

with Barry Guy New Orchestra
 Inscape–Tableaux (Intakt, 2001)

with Guy-Gustafsson-Strid Trio
 Gryffgryffgryffs: The 1996 Radio Sweden Concert (live) (Music & Arts, 1997)

with Barry Guy and Paul Lytton
 Odyssey (Intakt, 2001)
 Ithaca (Intakt, 2004)
 Phases of the Night (Intakt, 2008)
 Deep Memory (Intakt, 2016)

with Francois Houle
 Any Terrain Tumultuous (Red Toucan, 1995)

with Anders Jormin
 In Winds, In Light (ECM, 2004)

with Henry Kaiser
 Eternity Blue (Shanachie, 1995)

with Steve Lacy
 Five Facings (FMP, 1996)

with Joelle Leandre
 Joëlle Léandre Project (Leo, 2000)
 Stone Quartet: DMG @ The Stone Volume 1 (DMG/ARC, 2008)
 Stone Quartet: Live at Vision Festival (Ayler, 2011)

with Urs Leimgruber, Joelle Leandre and Fritz Hauser
 Quartet Noir (Victo, 1999)
 Quartet Noir Lugano (Victo, 2005)

with Joe Lovano
 Trio Tapestry (ECM, 2019)
 Garden of Expression (ECM, 2021)

with Raymond MacDonald
 Parallel Moments  (Babel, 2014)
 Songs Along the Way (Babel, 2018)

with Raymond MacDonald and Pierre Alexandre Tremblay
 Two Duos : Three Trios (Bruce's Fingers, 2016)

with The Roscoe Mitchell Creative Orchestra
 Sketches from Bamboo (Moers, 1979)

with Michael Moore and Gerry Hemingway
 MGM Trio (Ramboy, 1996)

with Tisziji Munoz
 Auspicious Healing! (Anami, 2000)
 Breaking the Wheel of Life and Death (Anami, 2000)
 Heart to Heart (Anami, 2013)
 Beautiful Empty Fullness (Anami, 2014)
 The Paradox of Independence (Anami, 2014)

with NOW Orchestra
 Pola (Victo, 2005)

with Larry Ochs
 The Secret Magritte (Black Saint, 1996)

with Parker-Guy-Lytton Trio 
 Natives and Aliens (Leo, 1997)
 After Appleby (Leo, 2000)

with Ivo Perelman
 En Adir (Music & Arts, 1997)
 Sound Hierarchy (Music & Arts, 1997)

with Nelly Pouget
 Le Voir (Minuit 5 Regards, 1998)

with Michele Rabbia and Vincent Courtois
 Shifting Grace (CAM Jazz, 2006)

with Gunhild Seim and David Rothenberg
 Grenseland (Drollehala, 2018)

with Gunhild Seim & Time Jungle
 Elephant Wings (Drollehala, 2012)

with Wadada Leo Smith
 Budding of a Rose (Moers, 1979)

with Reggie Workman
 Synthesis (Leo, 1986)
 Images (Music & Arts, 1990)
 Altered Spaces (Leo, 1993)

with Bobby Zankel
 Human Flowers (CIMP, 1996)

performing works of John Cage
 Works for Piano, Toy Piano & Prepared Piano, Vol. III (Wergo, 1991)

performing works of Robert Cogan, Pozzi Escot and Manfred Niehaus
 Stellar Pulsations / Three Composers (Leo, 1994)

Filmography
 "Rising Tones Cross" (1985) dir. Ebba Jahn
 Femmes du Jazz / Women in Jazz (2000) by Gilles Corre
 The Songpoet (2019) by Paul Lamont
 Motian in Motion (2020) by Michael Patrick Kelly
 ECM50 | 2000 - Marilyn Crispell (episode in a series of 51 short films on ECM, 2020) by IJ.Biermann

References

Additional sources 
Crispell, Marilyn. 2000. "Elements of Improvisation: For Cecil Taylor and Anthony Braxton." In Arcana: Musicians on Music, ed. John Zorn, 190-192. New York: Granary Books/Hips Road.

External links
Official website
short film portrait on Marilyn Crispell
Marilyn Crispell Interview at allaboutjazz.com
 Finding aid to the Marilyn Crispell collection at Columbia University. Rare Book & Manuscript Library.

1947 births
Living people
Avant-garde jazz musicians
Avant-garde jazz pianists
American jazz pianists
American women composers
American jazz composers
Musicians from Philadelphia
Women jazz pianists
New England Conservatory alumni
ECM Records artists
Cadence Jazz Records artists
20th-century American pianists
Jazz musicians from Pennsylvania
20th-century American women pianists
21st-century American pianists
21st-century American women pianists
Leo Records artists
Music & Arts artists
Intakt Records artists
Okka Disk artists